Frank Capra (1897–1991) was an Academy Award-winning Italian-American film director. 

Frank Capra may also refer to:
 Frank Capra Jr. (1934–2007), film studio executive and son of the aforementioned Frank Capra

See also
Francis Capra (born 1983), actor in Veronica Mars and Crank